A Mountain Is a Mouth is the full-length debut of Toronto folk-rock band Bruce Peninsula. It was recorded in various locations throughout the city, including the University of Toronto. It was long-listed for the 2009 Polaris Music Prize.

Track listing
"Inside/Outside" – 5:14
"Steamroller" – 4:40
"2nd 4th World War" – 5:04
"Satisfied" – 1:08
"Shutters"  – 5:32
"Weave Myself a Dress" – 4:51
"Crabapples" – 2:37
"Shanty Song" – 5:30
"Drinking All Day" – 4:14
"Northbound/Southbound" – 2:28

References

2009 debut albums
Bruce Peninsula (band) albums